Edward Joseph Collins Jr. (June 29, 1943 – January 29, 2007) was an American government official for the state of Massachusetts, the town of Saugus and the city of Boston. He is the namesake of the Edward J. Collins Jr. Center for Public Management at the University of Massachusetts Boston.

Early life
Collins was born and raised in Hyde Park. He attended Archbishop Williams High School, Boston College, and Boston College Law School.

Massachusetts Department of Revenue
In 1978 Collins was named a Deputy Commissioner of the Massachusetts Department of Revenue. He was in charge of the newly created Division of Local Services (DLS), which assisted local officials with the complexities of the recently passed Proposition 2½. He also helped create cutting edge computer technology to help cities and towns set and collect property taxes. In 1987, he received the Massachusetts Taxpayers Foundation Award for Outstanding Service to the Commonwealth. He was succeeded by his protégé and future Secretary of Administration and Finance Leslie Kirwan.

Saugus, Massachusetts
Collins was a 30-year resident of Saugus, Massachusetts. He spent one year as a town meeting member and one term (1977 to 1979) as a member of the Board of Selectmen. He then spent ten years as a member of the Board of Appeals.

In 1991 he was named Town Manager of Saugus. He was the architect of the town's Capital Improvement Plan, which resulted in the construction of the new public safety building, senior center, library and public works facility. He also secured funding for the renovation of Saugus Town Hall.

Boston
In 1996, Collins resigned as Saugus Town Manager to become the chief financial officer and treasurer of Boston. In this position he oversaw a $1.8 billion budget and brought fiscal discipline during a time of financial pressure. He was a childhood friend of Mayor Thomas Menino and was seen as part of his "inner circle". In the fall of 2000 he suffered a stroke which limited his ability to work. He retired in 2002, but stayed on as a special advisor until 2005.

Death and legacy
Collins died on January 29, 2007, at his home in North Reading, Massachusetts, after a lengthy illness. In July 2008, the new Center for Public Management was established at the University of Massachusetts Boston by Governor Deval Patrick and the state legislature and was named in his honor.

References

Carroll School of Management alumni
Boston College Law School alumni
Politicians from Boston
People from North Reading, Massachusetts
People from Saugus, Massachusetts
Town Managers of Saugus, Massachusetts
2007 deaths
1943 births
American chief financial officers
People from Hyde Park, Boston
Archbishop Williams High School alumni
20th-century American lawyers
21st-century American lawyers
21st-century American politicians
20th-century American politicians